Burgess, (formerly Marlow), is an unincorporated community in Horry County, South Carolina, United States, along South Carolina Highway 707  and is located between  the southern boundary between Horry and Georgetown counties. Burgess is roughly 28 square miles in area  and is flanked on  the west by the Waccamaw River and U.S. 17 Bypass to the east.   Burgess appears on the Brookgreen Gardens U.S. Geological Survey Map.

History
Originally called Marlow for the first postmaster, John W Marlow, who was appointed 6 May 1880. He was replaced by Jasper E Kennedy (his brother-in-law) in 1881, William H. Page in 1883, Christopher C. Marlow (John W Marlow's son) in 1884, and William Burgess in 16 Apr 1887. William Burgess remained the postmaster until his death 25 Sep 1934, and successfully changed the name to Burgess 15 Aug 1906. During the late 1890s Burgess was an African American farming community.

According to the 1990 census, the Burgess Community population was approximately 3,000, then grew to 25,000 according to the 2010 census.  Burgess during the last 20 years has transitioned from a rural community to a predominantly suburban community. Numerous master planned communities have been developed since 1990 such as TPC, Blackmoor and Laurel Woods. There are large tracts of land that remain undeveloped which retains some of the rural characteristics that preceded its rapid growth. Burgess also has a community center called Burgess Community Center located on South Carolina Highway 707 near Mt. Zion Church and St. James Middle School and just down the street from St. James High School.

Major roads/highways
South Carolina Highway 707
South Carolina Highway 31

Schools
St. James High School
St. James Middle School
 St. James Elementary School
 St. James Intermediate School
 Burgess Elementary School

References

External links
Wiki Satellite Photos - 

Unincorporated communities in South Carolina
Unincorporated communities in Horry County, South Carolina